The Ohio Department of Transportation (ODOT) is responsible for the establishment and classification of a state highway network which includes interstate highways, U.S. highways, and state routes. As with other states, U.S. and Interstate highways are classified as state routes in Ohio. There are no state routes which duplicate an existing U.S. or Interstate highway in Ohio.

Ohio distinguishes between "state routes", which are all the routes on ODOT's system, and "state highways", which are the roads on the state route system which ODOT maintains, i.e. those outside municipalities, with a special provision for Interstate Highways. Besides the state highway network, there are various county and township road networks within the state.

History

The Ohio Inter-County Highways were created on June 9, 1911, with the passage of the McGuire Bill (Senate Bill 165, 79th Ohio General Assembly). Main Market Roads, the most important of the system, were defined on April 15, 1913.

In 1923 the numbering system was simplified. It was altered further in 1927 in order to accommodate numbers in the United States Numbered Highway System.

In 1935 the Ohio General Assembly passed a law which added 5,000 miles of roads to the state highway system over a 12-month period. These roads were assigned route numbers in the 500s, 600s, and 700s.

In 1962 certain numbers were retired to accommodate numbers in the Interstate Highway System.

Highway systems

See also

 1927 Ohio state highway renumbering
 Transportation in Ohio

References

External links
Ohio Department of Transportation
Ohio Highway Ends at State Ends
The Unofficial Ohio State Highways Web Site
Explanation of the Ohio State Highway System

Highways